USS Helenita (YP-2230) was a motorboat acquired by the U.S. Navy during World War I. She was configured as a district patrol craft, and was used to patrol the Norfolk, Virginia, waterways. She was then loaned to the city of Norfolk before eventually being sold as excess to needs.

Built as a motorboat 

The second military vessel to be so named by the U.S. Navy, Helenita was a small wooden motor boat acquired by the Navy in 1919, probably from the Marine Aviation Corps.

World War I service 

She was used as a district patrol craft in the 5th Naval District, Norfolk, Virginia, from February to August 1919.

On loan to Norfolk, Virginia 

In August 1919 she was transferred to the City of Norfolk, Virginia, Department of Public Safety. Transferred 30 August, Helenita served the city until 1 December 1922, when she was returned to the Navy at Norfolk.

Final disposition 

She was finally sold to H. W. Bleckley, Milwaukee, Wisconsin, 22 June 1923.

References
 

World War I patrol vessels of the United States